R Reticuli is a Mira variable star in the southern constellation Reticulum. It is an aging red giant star on the asymptotic giant branch with a stellar classification that varies between M4e to M7.5e, being hottest near maximum visual magnitude. The mean maximum magnitude is 7.57 and the mean minimum magnitude 13.80.

Although this star was also assigned the variable star designation S Reticuli, this designation is no longer in use.

References

M-type giants
Mira variables
Reticulum (constellation)
029383
021252
Reticuli, R
Emission-line stars
TIC objects